Shenandoah County (formerly  Dunmore County) is a county located in the Commonwealth of Virginia. As of the 2020 United States Census, the population was 44,186. Its county seat is Woodstock. It is part of the Shenandoah Valley region of Virginia.

History
The Senedos, possibly an Iroquoian group, are thought to have occupied the area at one time, until they were said to have been slaughtered by the Catawba in the latter 17th century. The name of the Valley, and of the County, is most likely connected with this Native American group. It has also been attributed to General George Washington naming it in honor of John Skenandoa, an Oneida chief from New York who helped gain support of Oneida and Tuscarora warriors to aid the rebel colonists during the American Revolutionary War.

Colonial Governor Gooch formally purchased the entire Shenandoah Valley from the Six Nations of the Iroquois by the Treaty of Lancaster in 1744. The Iroquois had controlled the valley as a hunting ground, but European settlement had begun by that time. During Pontiac's War (1763–1766), Shawnee efforts to repel the white intruders reached as far east as the current county.

The county was established in 1772 as 'Dunmore County' for Virginia Colonial Governor John Murray, 4th Earl of Dunmore. Woodstock was designated the county seat. Dunmore was Virginia's last royal governor, and was forced from office during the American Revolution. During the war (1778), the rebels renamed the county 'Shenandoah'.

During the Civil War, the Battle of New Market took place in the county on 15 May 1864.

Geography

Fort Valley and the western slopes of the Massanutten Mountain are located within the county boundary.

Adjacent counties

 Hardy County, West Virginia – northwest
 Frederick County – northeast
 Warren County – east
 Page County – southeast
 Rockingham County – southwest

National protected areas
 Cedar Creek and Belle Grove National Historical Park (part)
 George Washington National Forest (part)

Transportation 
 Shenandoah Valley Commuter Bus Service offers weekday commuter bus service from the Northern Shenandoah Valley including Shenandoah County and Warren County to Northern Virginia and Washington, D.C. including Arlington County and Fairfax County. Origination points in Shenandoah County include Woodstock. Origination points in Warren County include Front Royal and Linden.

Major highways

Demographics

2020 census

Note: the US Census treats Hispanic/Latino as an ethnic category. This table excludes Latinos from the racial categories and assigns them to a separate category. Hispanics/Latinos can be of any race.

2010 Census
As of the 2010 United States Census, there were 41,993 people in the county. 93.0% were White, 1.7% Black or African American, 0.5% Asian, 0.2% Native American, 2.8% of some other race and 1.6% of two or more races. 6.1% were Hispanic or Latino (of any race). 26.4% were of American, 22.0% German, 10.3% English and 7.6% Irish ancestry.

2000 Census
As of the 2000 United States Census, there were 35,075 people, 14,296 households, and 10,064 families in the county. The population density was 68 people per square mile (26/km²). There were 16,709 housing units at an average density of 33 per square mile (13/km²). The racial makeup of the county was 95.60% White, 1.17% Black or African American, 0.18% Native American, 0.35% Asian, 0.02% Pacific Islander, 1.79% from other races, and 0.89% from two or more races. 3.40% of the population were Hispanic or Latino of any race.

There were 14,296 households, out of which 28.10% had children under the age of 18 living with them, 57.00% were married couples living together, 9.30% had a female householder with no husband present, and 29.60% were non-families. 25.10% of all households were made up of individuals, and 11.30% had someone living alone who was 65 years of age or older. The average household size was 2.42 and the average family size was 2.86.

The county population contained 22.30% under the age of 18, 6.60% from 18 to 24, 27.60% from 25 to 44, 26.20% from 45 to 64, and 17.30% who were 65 years of age or older. The median age was 41 years. For every 100 females there were 94.90 males. For every 100 females age 18 and over, there were 92.80 males.

The median income for a household in the county was $39,173, and the median income for a family was $45,080. Males had a median income of $29,952 versus $22,312 for females. The per capita income for the county was $19,755. About 5.80% of families and 8.20% of the population were below the poverty line, including 12.10% of those under age 18 and 8.80% of those age 65 or over.

Education

Private

Secondary institutions
 Shenandoah Valley Academy
 Massanutten Military Academy

Primary institutions
 Shenandoah Valley Adventist Elementary School
 Valley Baptist Christian School

Public

High schools
 Mountain View High School (Quicksburg)
 Strasburg High School
 Central High School (Woodstock)

Elementary and middle schools

 W.W. Robinson Elementary School (Woodstock)
 Peter Muhlenberg Middle School (Woodstock)
 Honey Run Elementary School (Quicksburg)
 North Fork Middle School (Quicksburg)
 Sandy Hook Elementary School (Strasburg)
 Signal Knob Middle School (Strasburg)

Other
 Triplett Tech (Mount Jackson)
 Massanutten Regional Governor's School (High School level, in Mount Jackson)

Communities

Towns 

 Edinburg (pop. 1,041)
 Mount Jackson (pop. 1,994)
 New Market (pop. 2,146)
 Strasburg (pop. 6,398)
 Toms Brook (pop. 258)
 Woodstock (pop. 5,097)

Census-designated places
 Basye (pop. 1,253)
 Bowmans Crossing
 Clary
 Columbia Furnace
 Conicville
 Fishers Hill
 Forestville
 Lebanon Church
 Locust Grove
 Hudson Crossroads
 Maurertown (pop. 770)
 Mount Clifton (pop. 110)
 Mount Olive
 Orkney Springs
 Quicksburg
 Saumsville

Other unincorporated communities

 Alonzaville
 Bedford
 Borden
 Calvary
 Carmel
 Coleytown
 Detrick
 Hamburg
 Harrisville
 Hawkinstown
 Hepners
 Jadwyn
 Jerome
 Kings Crossing
 Lantz Mill
 Macanie
 Moore's Store
 Mount Hermon
 Oak Grove
 Oranda
 Saint Luke
 Silver City
 Swover Creek
 Valley View
 Walkers Chapel
 Wesley Chapel
 Wheatfield
 Williamsville
 Zepp

Law enforcement

The Shenandoah County Sheriff's Office (SCSO) is the primary law enforcement agency in Shenandoah County. The SCSO was created on May 26, 1772 when the position of High Sheriff position was created; its main duty was to collect taxes.

The SCSO was accredited by the Virginia Law Enforcement Professional Standards Commission between 2006, when it first became accredited, and 2022, when it lost accreditation following an evaluation.

Politics
Politically, Shenandoah County is a massive outlier in Virginia. It is one of the most Republican counties in Virginia, a trend that predates the rest of western Virginia moving away from the Democratic Party. It was first won by a Republican Presidential nominee in 1896, and has voted Republican in every presidential election since 1936, and in all but one election since 1920. Nearly solidly Democratic before 1900, the county began voting Republican in statewide elections around the beginning of the 20th century but was a swing county. In the 1920s it became solidly Republican at a statewide level, with the exception of Democratic local hero Harry F. Byrd and his son. This early swing to the GOP came from the county’s rural voters being overwhelmingly German American Republicans, which overpowered the conservative Southern Democrat vote in the county population centers of New Market, Woodstock, and Strasburg. Virginia Constitutional Convention of 1902 was vehemently opposed by the counties of western Virginia due to the disenfranchisement of the many poor whites of the region. The once strong Democratic county turned Republican due to this convention, which, according to the Shenandoah Herald, was the “…death knell of the Democratic party in the valley counties.” The Democrats of the county were of the Jacksonian, small government stock; leading them to vote Republican after the perceived injustice by the state convention in the creation of a new constitution, which was not ratified by popular vote. The county briefly returned to its Southern Democrat roots at the state level during the civil rights movement. 

In 1856, Shenandoah County was the only county in Virginia to record votes in favor of the candidate of the newly-formed Republican Party, John C. Frémont.

See also
 National Register of Historic Places listings in Shenandoah County, Virginia
 New Market Airport
 Shenandoah County Sheriff’s Office
 Shenandoah Local History Collection at James Madison University's Special Collections
 Shenandoah Valley Miscellaneous Ledgers, Minute Books and Registers collection at James Madison University's Special Collections
 The Stone and Holt Weeks Foundation

References

 
Virginia counties
1772 establishments in Virginia